Tianducheng (Chinese: 天都城), also called Sky City, is a housing estate in Xingqiao Subdistrict, Linping District, Hangzhou, Zhejiang Province, China that imitates many design features of Paris.

History
Construction at Tianducheng began around 2007. It opened in 2007, and can accommodate more than 10,000 residents. Initial occupancy was low, with an estimated 2,000 people living in the development by 2013, leading some to label it a ghost town. By 2017, its population had grown to 30,000 and the development was expanded several times.

Transport
Huangheshan station on Line 3 of Hangzhou Metro serving Tianducheng opened on February 21, 2022.

Gallery

References

Geography of Hangzhou
Replica constructions in China